Bhaderwah or Bhadarwah (also Bhaderwah Valley) is a town, tehsil, sub-division and also additional district in the Doda district of the Jammu Division of Jammu and Kashmir, India. It is also known as Chota Kashmir (Mini Kashmir) for its scenic beauty and for its high literacy rate it is known as Kerala of  Jammu and Kashmir.

History
In 1841, Bhadarwah became part of J&K state. When Maharaja Partap Singh was crowned as king of Jammu and Kashmir, he gifted Bhadarwah to his younger brother Raja Amar Singh as "Jagir". The Jagir comprised Bhadarwah, Bhalessa and the vast area left of river Chenab from Thathri up to Khellani (Doda).

Demographics

Climate

Tourist destinations

Padri Top
Chinta valley
Sonbain
Jai Valley
Gupt Ganga 
Nalthi
Fish Pond
Chandi Mata Temple,Chinote
Bhaderwah Fort
Seoj Dhar
Padri Pass
Kansar valley
Kailash Kund
Vasuki Naag Temple
Tilligarh Resort
Jamia Masjid Bhaderwah
Laxmi Narayan Temple

References

External links 

 Bhaderwah Development Authority

 
Cities and towns in Doda district